Bianor was a Late Classical Greek poet from Bithynia, the author of 21 epigrams in the Greek Anthology, lived under the emperors Augustus and Tiberius. His epigrams were included by Philippus of Thessalonica in his collection.

References
Fabricius, Johann Albert, Bibliotheca Graeca iv. p. 467
Jacobs, Christian, Greek Anthology xiii. p. 868

People from Bithynia
Epigrammatists of the Greek Anthology
1st-century Greek poets
Roman-era Greeks